Hunston may refer to:

 Hunston, Suffolk
 Hunston, West Sussex